Sujiatun District is one of ten districts of the prefecture-level city of Shenyang, the capital of Liaoning Province, Northeast China, and forms part of the southern suburbs. The current population of Sujiatun is 430,000 and is located 15 km away from central Shenyang. Sujiatun is known mostly for its agricultural and industrial activity. It borders the districts of Yuhong and Heping to the north, Dongling to the northeast, Tiexi to the northwest; it also borders the prefecture-level cities of Fushun to the east, Benxi to the southeast, and Liaoyang to the southwest.

Administrative divisions
There are seven subdistricts, seven towns, and five townships within the district.

Subdistricts:
Jiefang Subdistrict, Tieyou Subdistrict, Minzhu Subdistrict, Linhu Subdistrict, Zhongxing Subdistrict, Huxi Subdistrict, Chengjiao Subdistrict

Towns:
Chenxiangtun, Shilihe, Honglingbao, Linshengbao, Bayi, Yaoqianhutun, Shahebao

Townships:
Wanggangbao Township, Yongle Township, Baiqingzhai Township, Tonggou Township, Dagou Township

References

External links

Shenyang
County-level divisions of Liaoning